Ehretia alba is a semi-deciduous shrub or small tree up to 4m high, growing in Namibia, Botswana and the western, drier regions of South Africa, and was first collected by Hermann Merxmüller at Breitenberg in the Gobabis district of Namibia. As with other species of Ehretia it is twiggy with rigid branches, its fascicled leaves showing a large variation in size (6-25 x 3-13 mm), with acute or obtuse apices, and appressed setae along margins. Midribs and secondary veins are prominent on the lower surfaces, while the petioles are only 3 mm long. Leaves are generally clustered or fascicled on abbreviated twigs. Flowers are fragrant and white to cream, while unopened buds are mauve. The mature fruit is red and shows a persistent calyx.

Until 2001 E. alba was regarded as simply a form of Ehretia rigida. The authors felt it differed sufficiently and consistently from E. rigida to merit a new taxon:

TYPE.—Namibia, 2218 (Gobabis): Breitenberg,
Gobabis Dist., (-DC). Merxmüller 1071 (WIND, holo.;
PRE, iso.).

External links
iSpot

Gallery

References

alba